Novoryazanskaya Street Garage, also spelled Novo-Ryazanskaya Street Garage, and known as "Horseshoe garage", was designed by Konstantin Melnikov and Vladimir Shukhov (structural engineering) in 1926 and completed in 1929 at 27, Novoryazanskaya Street in Krasnoselsky District, Moscow, Russia, near Kazansky Rail Terminal. This garage is still used as such, and houses Moscow's Fourth Bus Park.

Photos

See also
 Bakhmetevsky Bus Garage
 Konstantin Melnikov
 Vladimir Shukhov

References

Truck Garage, Novo-Ryazanskaya Street
 Elizabeth Cooper English: «Arkhitektura i mnimosti»: The origins of Soviet avant-garde rationalist architecture in the Russian mystical-philosophical and mathematical intellectual tradition", a dissertation in architecture, 264 p., University of Pennsylvania, 2000.

 Rainer Graefe und andere, «Vladimir G. Suchov 1853—1939. Die Kunst der sparsamen Konstruktion.», 192 S., Deutsche Verlags-Anstalt, Stuttgart, 1990, .

Model of Novo-Ryazanskaya Street Garage
Novo-Ryazanskaya Street Garage

 Мельников К.С.: "Архитектура моей жизни. Творческая концепция. Творческая практика." — М.: Искусство, 311 стр., 1985
 Хан-Магомедов С.О.: "Константин Мельников" — М., изд. "Архитектура-С", cерия: "Мастера архитектуры", 296 стр., 2006, 
 Шухова Е.М.: «Владимир Григорьевич Шухов. Первый инженер России.», 368 стр., Изд. МГТУ, Москва, 2003, .

Russian avant-garde
Constructivist architecture
Roof structures by Vladimir Shukhov
Buildings and structures in Moscow
Transport infrastructure completed in 1929
Tourist attractions in Moscow
Modernist architecture in Russia
Cultural heritage monuments of regional significance in Moscow